Pic Long (3,192 m) is the highest mountain in the Néouvielle massif in the Pyrenees.

It is located in the commune of Saint-Lary-Soulan within the department of the Hautes-Pyrénées.

External links
 Pic Long on SummitPost

Mountains of Hautes-Pyrénées
Mountains of the Pyrenees
Pyrenean three-thousanders